The procurement of Landing Platform Docks (LPD) by the Indian Navy, formerly known as the "Multi-Role Support Vessel Program" (MRSV) - is an initiative of the Indian Navy to procure a series of landing platform docks, specific vessels dedicated to amphibious warfare, as part of the service's strategy to augment its capabilities of amphibious warfare, disaster-response, humanitarian assistance and auxiliary duties.

India had long sought to procure amphibious warfare vessels, including landing platform docks; multiple initiatives in procuring specified vessels of the aforementioned type were initiated as early as 2009. However, such measures have been frequently delayed, on account of varying reasons.

The Indian Navy currently operates one landing platform dock - INS Jalashwa, an ex-Austin-class amphibious transport dock, which was purchased from the United States Navy (USN) in 2007.

History

Origins

The Indian Navy had long sought to procure amphibious warfare vessels, as a part of its scheme to augment its capabilities of amphibious warfare, disaster-response management and evacuation of civilians and personnel.

In the wake of the 2004 Indian Ocean tsunami, the Indian Armed Forces initiated one of the largest Humanitarian Assistance and Disaster Relief (HADR) operations in its history; the navy quickly dispatched Indian naval vessels to send supplies to multiple countries that had been affected by the tsunami, namely, Sri Lanka, Indonesia and the Maldives. However, the experience unraveled a significant drawback - India's naval forces barely possessed the capability to undertake amphibious transport operations nor humanitarian assistance operations on a large scale, although it operated landing tank crafts, which were capable of undertaking amphibious operations, albeit at a limited capacity.

With the revelation of the issue, India quickly sought to procure amphibious vessels capable of tackling the issues of amphibious warfare and disaster response management. In 2007, the Indian government purchased the USS Trenton, a decommissioned Austin-class amphibious transport dock from the United States Navy (USN) and re-commissioned it as the INS Jalashwa. Since its re-commissioning, Jalashwa executed numerous disaster-response and humanitarian-relief operations, most notably during the COVID-19 pandemic.

In addition Jalashwa, India was also offered the USS Nashville, another Austin-class vessel; however, the purchase was never made.

"Multi-Role Support Vessel" Initiative (MRSV) 
In 2011, the Indian Navy established the "Multi-Role Support Vessel" Program (MSRV), an initiative to acquire four landing platform docks from a foreign naval firm. Under the initiative, India issued a Request For Information (RFI) to multiple foreign naval firms, under the "Buy and Make (Indian)" category of India's 2011 defense acquisition regulations.

In 2013, the service issued a Request For Proposal (RFP) to four domestic shipbuilders - L&T Shipbuilding (L&T), ABG Shipyard (ABG), Pipavav Shipyard Limited (RDEL) and Hindustan Shipyard Limited (HSL). Under this scheme, the winner of the bid would be requested to build two landing platform docks, while the remaining two were to be built by the state-owned HSL.

Under this program, which was then worth USD $2.65 billion, the three private shipyards tied up with different foreign conglomerates - L&T allied with the Spain-based Navantia, RDEL allied with the France-based DCNS (now Naval Group), while ABG tied with the US-based Alion. However, ABG suffered from severe financial constraints and was deeply in debt; the company was later disqualified from the tender on account of its financial woes. L&T and RDEL were the only shipyards which met the technical and financial eligibility criteria in the tender; however, RDEL too suffered from increasing financial debts - which made it unsuitable for participating in the tender; this left L&T as the only prospective vendor in the bid.

In 2017, the Defence Acquisition Council (DAC), the arms acquisition body of India's Ministry of Defence (MoD), approved the procurement of the four vessels. Concurrently, both L&T and RDEL submitted revised commercial bids to build all the four vessels, in stark contrast to the specifications of the 2013 tender, which regulated that the selected private shipyard must build only two vessels.

The competition narrowed down to two contenders - an alliance of L&T-Navantia offering the Juan Carlos I-class amphibious assault vessel and another alliance of RDEL-DCNS offering the Mistral-class amphibious assault vessel.

Cancellation 
From its inception in 2013 till 2020, the MRSV program underwent seven extensions and one re-submission of bids.

In 2019, after a string of delays in the project, the Indian Navy approached the MoD to cancel the tender, then worth USD $3 billion. With ABG disqualified from competing and RDEL on the brink of bankruptcy, L&T prevailed as the only qualified contender capable of handling the project; nonetheless, the MoD favored several suggestions of scrapping the tender, in order to circumvent a "single-vendor situation".

In September 2020, the Comptroller and Auditor General of India (CAG) criticized the Indian Navy over its failure to proceed with the project and lambasted the project's long-period of inactivity. Later that month, the MoD scrapped the tender, then worth INR , given the tender's prolonged inactivity and lack of action. With the termination of the contract, the Indian Navy reportedly planned to initiate a fresh bidding process for the acquisition of a new fleet of landing platform docks, with new qualitative requirements.

In November 2020, the Indian Navy revised its original plan of purchasing four landing platform docks to just two, citing severe budgetary constraints and inadequate funding.

Revival 
In August 2021, the MoD issued a new RFI for the procurement of four landing platform docks to domestic Indian shipyards, under guidelines of its "Defence Acquisition Procedure 2020" (DAP-2020). According to the details of the RFI, the first vessel built should be ready for delivery within 60 months of the contract being signed, while the remaining three should be delivered at one-year intervals. Furthere specifications of the RFI dictated that the competing Indian shipyards must seek transfer-of-technology (TOT) from a foreign naval shipbuilder, and that the four prescribed vessels must be built in India, with a proportion of indigenous content.

Planned capabilities
To undertake "Out-of-Area Contingencies" (OOAC).
To support/assist land-based operations.
To execute disaster-response and humanitarian-relief operations.
To undertake fleet-support functions through replenishment capability and comprehensive workshop facilities.
To provide medical facilities for the treatment of battle-casualties.

Potential contenders 

According to multiple sources, the following Indian shipyards may participate in the tender -

Potential shipyards
Cochin Shipyard Limited (CSL) :-
Based in Kochi, CSL is the largest shipbuilder in India and has long been a supplier to the Indian Navy. Was principally involved in the construction of India's first indigenously designed aircraft carrier, INS Vikrant.
L&T Shipbuilding (L&T) :-
Based in Hazira and Kattupalli, L&T is a noted supplier to the Indian Navy and the Indian Coast Guard.
Garden Reach Shipbuilders & Engineers (GRSE) :-
Based in Kolkata, GRSE has long been a supplier to the Indian Navy; having delivered over 100 warships, including the Shardul-class amphibious warfare vessels, the Kamorta-class corvettes, the Aditya-class auxiliary vessels, the Mk. IV LCU landing craft vessels and other warships.
Mazagon Dock Limited (MDL) :-
Based in Mumbai, MDL is a distinguished supplier to the Indian Navy; having delivered numerous warships, including the Visakhapatnam-class destroyers, the Kolkata-class destroyers, the Shivalik-class frigates and the Kalvari-class submarines.

Prospective designs

According to multiple sources, the following naval designs may be offered in the tender -

  :
May offer the Mistral-class amphibious warfare vessel.
Designed by Naval Group and currently operated by the French Navy and the Egyptian Navy.
Was previously offered to India, in joint-partnership with Reliance Defence & Engineering Limited.
Participated with the Indian Navy in the Indo-French "VARUNA-21" joint-naval exercise.
  :
May offer the Juan Carlos-I amphibious warfare vessels.
Designed by Navantia and currently operated by the Spanish Navy, the Royal Australian Navy and the Turkish Naval Forces.
Was previously offered to India, in joint-partnership with Larsen & Toubro.
Participated with the Indian Navy in the Indo-Australian "AUSINDEX-2019" joint-naval exercise.
  :
May offer a variant of the Trieste landing helicopter dock.
Designed by Fincantieri and currently operated by the Italian Navy.
  :
May offer an export variant of Project 23900 amphibious warfare vessel.
Designed by JSC Zelenodolsk Design Bureau and currently being built for the Russian Navy.
  :
May offer the Dokdo-class amphibious warfare vessel.
Designed by Hanjin Heavy Industries and currently operated by the Republic of Korea Navy.
Reportedly offered to India, under the MRSV tender.

See also
Other amphibious vessels operated by the Indian Navy
  - India's only active landing platform dock, purchased from the United States in 2007. Was previously the USS Trenton of the United States Navy.

Other references to the Indian Navy
List of active Indian Navy ships
Future of the Indian Navy

References

External links
The Indian Navy's New ‘Expeditionary’ Outlook, Admiral (Retd) Arun Prakash, 20 October 2012. Observer Research Foundation.

Indian Navy
Amphibious warfare vessels of the Indian Navy
Military acquisition
Ships of the Indian Navy